Ephraim W. Bouvé (1817-1897) was an engraver in Boston, Massachusetts, in the 19th century. Around 1848 he kept a studio on Washington Street. By 1863 he had moved his studio to Bromfield Street, and by 1883 moved again, to Milk Street. E.W. Bouvé served as a judge in the category for "paper, blank books, stationery, etc." in the 1887 exhibition of the Massachusetts Charitable Mechanic Association.

There were two lithographers called "E.W. Bouvé" in Boston in the 1840s: Ephraim and Elisha. The latter was probably related to the Boston cabinetmaker Ephraim Osborn Bouvé; they shared a home on Cooper Street.

References

External links

 WorldCat. Bouvé, Ephraim W. 1817-1897
 Boston Public Library. Maps by Bouvé

1817 births
1897 deaths
American engravers
Artists from Boston
19th-century American people